Myrmex texanus is a species of antlike weevil in the beetle family Curculionidae. It is found in North America.

References

Curculioninae
Weevils
Articles created by Qbugbot
Beetles described in 1907